Lama Tasi (born ) is a former Samoa international rugby league footballer who played as a .

He played for the Sydney Roosters and the Brisbane Broncos in the National Rugby League, and the Salford Red Devils in two separate spells, St Helens and the Warrington Wolves in the Super League.

Background
Tasi was born in Auckland, New Zealand. His family moved to Australia when he was three years old, settling in the Ipswich suburb of Riverview, Queensland. The oldest of his seven siblings, Tasi then moved to the nearby suburb of Goodna, Queensland.

He began playing rugby league for the local club, the Goodna Eagles. Tasi would represent the Queensland Under 12s state side before taking up a scholarship at Ipswich Grammar School.

Early years
After finishing his education, Tasi moved to Sydney to play in the National Youth Competition for the Manly-Warringah Sea Eagles in 2009 and 2010, making the team of the year in 2010 and representing the Junior Kiwis. He then signed with the Sydney Roosters for the 2011 season.

Club career

Sydney Roosters
Tasi made his début in 2011 in the Roosters round 8 match against the Gold Coast Titans. Coming off the bench, Tasi made his presence felt by putting a big hit on the Titans, NSW and Australian representative forward Greg Bird. Tasi played 9 more games for the Roosters in his début season, starting twice.

In December 2011, Tasi pledged his allegiance to the Queensland State of Origin and Australian national sides and was named in Queensland's 14 man emerging squad for 2012.

Brisbane Broncos
In June 2013, Tasi was granted a release from the Roosters and signed with the Brisbane Broncos for the remainder of the 2013 season.

Salford Red Devils
On 24 September 2013, it was confirmed Lama Tasi was to join the Salford Red Devils in 2014.

St Helens
On 29 May 2015, it was confirmed Lama Tasi was to join the 2014 Super League Champions St. Helens on a two-year deal starting in 2016.

Salford Red Devils
Salford Red Devils have re-signed Samoa international forward Lama Tasi on an initial one-year contract. The 26-year-old left to join St Helens at the end of 2015 on a two-year deal after 57 appearances for the club.

Warrington Wolves
Warrington Wolves announced the signing of Lama Tasi in October 2018. He made his competitive debut vs Hull Kingston Rovers in round 2 of the season. gaining heritage number 1150.

International career
On 20 April 2013, Lama made his international debut, playing for Samoa in their 2013 Pacific Rugby League International match against fierce Pacific rivals Tonga.

Personal life
Lama is the older brother of former South Sydney Rabbitohs player Tautalatasi Tasi, and the Cousin of Canterbury Bulldogs player Raymond Faitala-Mariner.

References

External links
Warrington Wolves profile
Salford Red Devils profile
St Helens profile
Sydney Roosters profile
SL profile

1990 births
Living people
Brisbane Broncos players
Ipswich Jets players
Junior Kiwis players
New Zealand emigrants to Australia
New Zealand sportspeople of Samoan descent
New Zealand rugby league players
Newtown Jets NSW Cup players
People from Queensland
Rugby league players from Auckland
Rugby league props
Salford Red Devils players
Samoa national rugby league team players
Samoan rugby league players
St Helens R.F.C. players
Sydney Roosters players
Warrington Wolves players